Saint-Bruno—Saint-Hubert (formerly known as Saint-Hubert) was a federal electoral district in Quebec, Canada, that was represented in the House of Commons of Canada from 1988 to 2015. Its population in 2001 was 99,755.

Geography
This South Shore district in the Quebec region of Montérégie included the former Towns of Saint-Bruno-de-Montarville and Saint-Hubert in the city of Longueuil.

The neighbouring ridings were Saint-Lambert, Longueuil—Pierre-Boucher, Verchères—Les Patriotes, Chambly—Borduas, and Brossard—La Prairie.

History
The electoral district of "Saint-Hubert" was created in 1987 from parts of Chambly and La Prairie ridings.

Saint-Hubert initially consisted of the towns of Greenfield Park, Lemoyne and Saint-Hubert, and part of the Town of Longueuil. In 1996, the riding was redefined to consist of the cities of Saint-Bruno-de-Montarville and Saint-Hubert.

The name of the riding was changed to "Saint-Bruno—Saint-Hubert" in 1997.

It was abolished for the 2015 election.

Members of Parliament

This riding has elected the following Members of Parliament:

Election results

Saint-Bruno—Saint-Hubert, 1997-present

		
Note: Conservative vote is compared to the total of the Canadian Alliance vote and Progressive Conservative vote in 2000 election.

Saint-Hubert, 1987-1997

See also
 List of Canadian federal electoral districts
 Past Canadian electoral districts

References

Campaign expense data from Elections Canada
Riding history from the Library of Parliament:
Saint-Hubert
Saint-Bruno—Saint-Hubert
2011 Results from Elections Canada

Notes

Former federal electoral districts of Quebec
Politics of Longueuil
Saint-Bruno-de-Montarville